Rhoemetalces III was a King of the Sapaean Thracians. He was the son of the Monarch Rhescuporis II. In association with his wife Pythodoris II (daughter of his cousin Cotys III), they were client rulers of the Sapaean kingdom of Thrace under the Romans from AD 38 to 46, in succession to Pythodoris’ mother Tryphaena and Pythodoris' brother Rhoemetalces II. 

Rhoemetalces III was murdered in 46, by insurgents or on the orders of his wife. The subsequent fate of Pythodoris II is unknown; it seems he did not have any children with his cousin. Thrace became incorporated into the Roman Empire as a province. 

Remetalk Point on Livingston Island in the South Shetland Islands, Antarctica is named after him.

References

See also 
List of Thracian tribes
Odrysian kingdom

46 deaths
Roman client rulers
1st-century murdered monarchs
1st-century monarchs in Europe
Year of birth unknown
Eponymous archons
Odrysian kings